The 80th district of the Texas House of Representatives consists of a portion of El Paso County. The current Representative is Tracy King, who has represented the district since 2005.

References 

80